In elementary geometry, two geometric objects are perpendicular if their intersection forms right angles (angles that are 90 degrees or π/2 radians wide) at the point of intersection called a foot. The condition of perpendicularity may be represented graphically using the perpendicular symbol, ⟂. Perpendicular intersections can happen between two lines (or two line segments), between a line and a plane, and between two planes.

Perpendicularity is one particular instance of the more general mathematical concept of orthogonality; perpendicularity is the orthogonality of classical geometric objects. Thus, in advanced mathematics, the word "perpendicular" is sometimes used to describe much more complicated geometric orthogonality conditions, such as that between a surface and its normal vector.

Definitions
A line is said to be perpendicular to another line if the two lines intersect at a right angle. Explicitly, a first line is perpendicular to a second line if (1) the two lines meet; and (2) at the point of intersection the straight angle on one side of the first line is cut by the second line into two congruent angles. Perpendicularity can be shown to be symmetric, meaning if a first line is perpendicular to a second line, then the second line is also perpendicular to the first. For this reason, we may speak of two lines as being perpendicular (to each other) without specifying an order. A great example of perpendicularity can be seen in any compass, note the cardinal points; North, East, South, West (NESW)
The line N-S is perpendicular to the line W-E and the angles N-E, E-S, S-W and W-N are all 90° to one another.

Perpendicularity easily extends to segments and rays. For example, a line segment  is perpendicular to a line segment  if, when each is extended in both directions to form an infinite line, these two resulting lines are perpendicular in the sense above. In symbols,  means line segment AB is perpendicular to line segment CD.

A line is said to be perpendicular to a plane if it is perpendicular to every line in the plane that it intersects. This definition depends on the definition of perpendicularity between lines.

Two planes in space are said to be perpendicular if the dihedral angle at which they meet is a right angle.

Foot of a perpendicular
The word foot is frequently used in connection with perpendiculars. This usage is exemplified in the top diagram, above, and its caption. The diagram can be in any orientation. The foot is not necessarily at the bottom.

More precisely, let  be a point and  a line.

Construction of the perpendicular 

To make the perpendicular to the line AB through the point P using compass-and-straightedge construction, proceed as follows (see figure left):

 Step 1 (red): construct a circle with center at P to create points A' and B' on the line AB, which are equidistant from P.
 Step 2 (green): construct circles centered at A' and B' having equal radius.  Let Q and P be the points of intersection of these two circles.
 Step 3 (blue): connect Q and P to construct the desired perpendicular PQ.

To prove that the PQ is perpendicular to AB, use the SSS congruence theorem for QPA' and QPB' to conclude that angles OPA' and OPB' are equal.  Then use the SAS congruence theorem for triangles OPA' and OPB' to conclude that angles POA and POB are equal.

To make the perpendicular to the line g at or through the point P using Thales's theorem, see the animation at right.

The Pythagorean theorem can be used as the basis of methods of constructing right angles. For example, by counting links, three pieces of chain can be made with lengths in the ratio 3:4:5. These can be laid out to form a triangle, which will have a right angle opposite its longest side. This method is useful for laying out gardens and fields, where the dimensions are large, and great accuracy is not needed. The chains can be used repeatedly whenever required.

In relationship to parallel lines 

If two lines (a and b) are both perpendicular to a third line (c), all of the angles formed along the third line are right angles.  Therefore, in Euclidean geometry, any two lines that are both perpendicular to a third line are parallel to each other, because of the parallel postulate.  Conversely, if one line is perpendicular to a second line, it is also perpendicular to any line parallel to that second line.

In the figure at the right, all of the orange-shaded angles are congruent to each other and all of the green-shaded angles are congruent to each other, because vertical angles are congruent and alternate interior angles formed by a transversal cutting parallel lines are congruent.  Therefore, if lines a and b are parallel, any of the following conclusions leads to all of the others:

 One of the angles in the diagram is a right angle.
 One of the orange-shaded angles is congruent to one of the green-shaded angles.
 Line c is perpendicular to line a.
 Line c is perpendicular to line b.

In computing distances

Graph of functions 

In the two-dimensional plane, right angles can be formed by two intersected lines if the product of their slopes equals  −1. However, this method cannot be used if the slope is zero or undefined (the line is parallel to an axis).

The lines will be perpendicular if and only if . This method is simplified from the dot product (or, more generally, the inner product) of vectors. In particular, two vectors are considered orthogonal if their inner product is zero.

In circles and other conics

Circles

Each diameter of a circle is perpendicular to the tangent line to that circle at the point where the diameter intersects the circle.

A line segment through a circle's center bisecting a chord is perpendicular to the chord.

If the intersection of any two perpendicular chords divides one chord into lengths a and b and divides the other chord into lengths c and d, then  equals the square of the diameter.

The sum of the squared lengths of any two perpendicular chords intersecting at a given point is the same as that of any other two perpendicular chords intersecting at the same point, and is given by 8r2 – 4p2 (where r is the circle's radius and p is the distance from the center point to the point of intersection).

Thales' theorem states that two lines both through the same point on a circle but going through opposite endpoints of a diameter are perpendicular. This is equivalent to saying that any diameter of a circle subtends a right angle at any point on the circle, except the two endpoints of the diameter.

Ellipses

The major and minor axes of an ellipse are perpendicular to each other and to the tangent lines to the ellipse at the points where the axes intersect the ellipse.

The major axis of an ellipse is perpendicular to the directrix and to each latus rectum.

Parabolas

In a parabola, the axis of symmetry is perpendicular to each of the latus rectum, the directrix, and the tangent line at the point where the axis intersects the parabola.

From a point on the tangent line to a parabola's vertex, the other tangent line to the parabola is perpendicular to the line from that point through the parabola's focus.

The orthoptic property of a parabola is that If two tangents to the parabola are perpendicular to each other, then they intersect on the directrix. Conversely, two tangents which intersect on the directrix are perpendicular. This implies that, seen from any point on its directrix, any parabola subtends a right angle.

Hyperbolas

The transverse axis of a hyperbola is perpendicular to the conjugate axis and to each directrix.

The product of the perpendicular distances from a point P on a hyperbola or on its conjugate hyperbola to the asymptotes is a constant independent of the location of P.

A rectangular hyperbola has asymptotes that are perpendicular to each other. It has an eccentricity equal to

In polygons

Triangles

The legs of a right triangle are perpendicular to each other.

The altitudes of a triangle are perpendicular to their respective bases. The perpendicular bisectors of the sides also play a prominent role in triangle geometry.

The Euler line of an isosceles triangle is perpendicular to the triangle's base.

The Droz-Farny line theorem concerns a property of two perpendicular lines intersecting at a triangle's orthocenter.

Harcourt's theorem concerns the relationship of line segments through a vertex and perpendicular to any line tangent to the triangle's incircle.

Quadrilaterals

In a square or other rectangle, all pairs of adjacent sides are perpendicular. A right trapezoid is a trapezoid that has two pairs of adjacent sides that are perpendicular.

Each of the four maltitudes of a quadrilateral is a perpendicular to a side through the midpoint of the opposite side.

An orthodiagonal quadrilateral is a quadrilateral whose diagonals are perpendicular. These include the square, the rhombus, and the kite. By Brahmagupta's theorem, in an orthodiagonal quadrilateral that is also cyclic, a line through the midpoint of one side and through the intersection point of the diagonals is perpendicular to the opposite side.

By van Aubel's theorem, if squares are constructed externally on the sides of a quadrilateral, the line segments connecting the centers of opposite squares are perpendicular and equal in length.

Lines in three dimensions

Up to three lines in three-dimensional space can be pairwise perpendicular, as exemplified by the x, y, and z axes of a three-dimensional Cartesian coordinate system.

See also 
 Orthogonal projection
 Tangential and normal components

Notes

References

External links 

Definition: perpendicular with interactive animation.
How to draw a perpendicular bisector of a line with compass and straight edge (animated demonstration).
How to draw a perpendicular at the endpoint of a ray with compass and straight edge (animated demonstration).

Orthogonality